ROCS Si Ning (PFG-1203) is a Kang Ding-class frigate of the Republic of China Navy.

Development and design 
As the ROC (Taiwan)'s defensive stance is aimed towards the Taiwan Strait, the ROC Navy is constantly seeking to upgrade its anti-submarine warfare capabilities. The US$1.75 billion agreement with France in the early 1990s was an example of this procurement strategy, the six ships are configured for both ASW and surface attack. The Exocet was replaced by Taiwan-developed Hsiung Feng II anti-ship missile and the AAW weapon is the Sea Chaparral. The main gun is an Oto Melara 76 mm/62 mk 75 gun, similar to its Singaporean counterparts, the Formidable-class frigates. Some problems in the integration of Taiwanese and French systems had been reported. The frigate carries a single Sikorsky S-70C(M)-1/2 ASW helicopter.

The Sea Chaparral SAM system is considered inadequate for defense against aircraft and anti-ship missiles, so the ROC (Taiwan) Navy plans to upgrade its air-defense capabilities with the indigenous TC-2N in 2020. The AMRAAM missiles will be quad-packed in a vertical launch system for future ROCN surface combatants, but a less-risky alternative arrangement of above-deck, fixed oblique launchers is seen as more likely for upgrading these French-built frigates.

Construction and career 
Si Ning was launched on 5 November 1994 at the DCNS in Lorient. Commissioned on 5 October 1996.

In 2017, she participated in the annual Dunmu Voyage Training Detachment of the Republic of China Navy. ROCS Pan Shi warship served as the flagship for Si Ning and ROCS Zhang Qian warships. From February 25 to March 14, they visited Kaohsiung, Anping, Magong, Taichung, and Keelung, Suao, Hualien and other ports are open for public visits. For the first time, the head of state will see off in person. Cheering for the officers and soldiers who are about to go abroad to promote the relief of overseas Chinese and the team led by Major General Jiang Zhengguo visited the Solomon Islands, Marshall Islands, Kiribati and Palau during the period.

On 4 August 2018, Tang Huosheng, deputy chief executive of the Central Joint Service Center of the Executive Yuan, led a visit the Si Ning.

On 22 March 2019, the National Defense Intellectual Tour and the Dunkin Good-Neighborly Open Tour, Si Ning warship berthed at Taipei Port for the first time which she arrived on 21 March.

Gallery

References 

1994 ships
Ships built in France
Kang Ding-class frigates